GCU London is a postgraduate campus of Glasgow Caledonian University specialising in Insurance, Banking and Finance, Risk Management, International Fashion Marketing, Luxury Brand Marketing, Public Health and Construction Management.

Based in Spitalfields, the centre offers a range of MBA and MSc courses. GCU is reportedly the first Scottish university to open a base in London.

The campus opened in September 2010.

Subjects 

GCU is a Chartered Institute for Securities & Investment (CISI) Centre of Excellence and GCU London finance students can obtain Chartered Banker status. GCU London also offers the UK's first MBA in Luxury Brand Marketing. Other Subject areas available at GCU London include:

 Insurance, Banking, Finance and Risk 
 Fashion and Luxury 
 Business, Management and Marketing 
 Construction and Project Management 
 Public Health

Campus 

GCU London is based in Fashion Street, Spitalfields, and features a variety of lecture theatres, teaching rooms, a library, breakout lounges, and group learning spaces. It provides all of the university services offered at its Glasgow campus.

The Moorish-style converted building dates back to 1905.

Scholarships 

Retailers Marks and Spencer sponsor scholarships for GCU London's courses in Fashion. GCU London also offers a range of additional Scholarships to help student fund their studies.

References 

  Scots university to set up satellite branch in London - The Herald 13/02/10 <http://www.heraldscotland.com/news/education/scots-university-to-set-up-satellite-branch-in-london-1.1006201>

Glasgow Caledonian University